The Forty-Third Wisconsin Legislature convened from  to  in regular session.  They also convened in a special session from August 17 through August 20, 1897. 

This was the first legislative session after the redistricting of the Senate and Assembly according to an act of the previous session. 

Senators representing even-numbered districts were newly elected for this session and were serving the first two years of a four-year term. Assembly members were elected to a two-year term. Assembly members and even-numbered senators were elected in the general election of November 3, 1896. Senators representing odd-numbered districts were serving the third and fourth year of a four-year term, having been elected in the general election of November 6, 1894.

Major events
 January 4, 1897: Inauguration of Edward Scofield as 19th Governor of Wisconsin.
 January 31, 1897: John Coit Spooner was elected United States Senator by the Wisconsin Legislature in joint session.
 March 4, 1897: Inauguration of William McKinley as 25th President of the United States.
 May 3, 1897: Wisconsin state legislator William A. Jones was confirmed by the U.S. Senate as commissioner of Indian Affairs.
 November 25, 1897: The Spanish Empire granted autonomy to Puerto Rico.
 January 1, 1898: New York City annexed territory from surrounding counties, becoming the second largest city in the world at that time.
 January 11, 1898: Wisconsin Supreme Court justice Alfred Newman died in office.
 January 25, 1898: Wisconsin Governor Edward Scofield appointed Charles V. Bardeen to the Wisconsin Supreme Court to replace the deceased justice Alfred Newman.
 February 15, 1898: The USS Maine exploded in Havana harbor, Cuba, for reasons that are still not known.  266 died in the disaster, which would become the inciting event of the Spanish–American War.
 March 1, 1898: Vladimir Lenin created the Russian Social Democratic Labour Party.
 April 25, 1898: The United States declared war against the Spanish Empire over the destruction of the Maine.
 July 7, 1898: The United States annexed the Hawaiian Islands.
 November 8, 1898: general election
 Edward Scofield was re-elected as Governor of Wisconsin.
 Wisconsin voters rejected the new state banking law in a mandatory referendum.
 December 10, 1898: Representatives of the United States and Spain signed the Treaty of Paris, ending the Spanish–American War. Spain ceded the territories of Cuba, Puerto Rico, Guam, and the Philippines to U.S. control.

Major legislation
 April 22, 1897: An Act to revise the laws authorizing the business of banking, 1897 Act 303.  Attempted to create a state department of banking.  The Wisconsin Constitution required that any law which enabled the business of banking in Wisconsin had to be approved by a public referendum.  This legislation went to the voters in the 1898 general election and was defeated.
 Joint Resolution that the foregoing proposed amendment to the constitution of the state of Wisconsin be and the same is agreed to by this legislature, 1897 Joint Resolution 9.  This was the second legislative passage of a proposed amendment to grant authority to the legislature to determine the appropriate number of circuit court seats for single-county circuits.  The amendment would be ratified by the voters in the Spring 1897 election.
 Joint Resolution to amend article No. 11 of the constitution of the state of Wisconsin, 1897 Joint Resolution 17.  Proposed an amendment which would enable the Legislature to set limits on taxation enacted by counties and towns in the state.  This amendment would not proceed beyond this step.
 Joint Resolution proposing an amendment to section 1, of article 10, of the constitution of the state of Wisconsin relating to education, 1897 Joint Resolution 22.  Proposed a constitutional amendment to move the election of Superintendent of Public Instruction from the Fall of even numbered years to the Spring of odd numbered years.  This amendment also would not proceed, but the proposed change would be enacted by a later amendment.

Summary

Senate summary

Assembly summary

Sessions
 1st Regular session: January 13, 1897April 21, 1897
 August 1897 Special session: August 17, 1897August 20, 1897

Leaders

Senate leadership
 President of the Senate: Emil Baensch (R) 
 President pro tempore: Lyman W. Thayer (R)

Assembly leadership
 Speaker of the Assembly: George A. Buckstaff (R)

Members

Members of the Senate
Members of the Senate for the Forty-Third Wisconsin Legislature:

Members of the Assembly
Members of the Assembly for the Forty-Third Wisconsin Legislature:

Committees

Senate committees
 Senate Committee on AgricultureMcGillivray, chair
 Senate Committee on Assessment and Collection of TaxesWoodworth, chair
 Senate Committee on Banks and InsuranceDavis, chair
 Senate Committee on Bills on Third ReadingWhelan, chair
 Senate Committee on CorporationsMills, chair
 Senate Committee on EducationStout, chair
 Senate Committee on Enrolled BillsPhillips, chair
 Senate Committee on Engrossed BillsConger, chair
 Senate Committee on Federal RelationsWhitman, chair
 Senate Committee on the JudiciaryAustin, chair
 Senate Committee on Legislative ExpensesConger, chair
 Senate Committee on ManufacturesDennett, chair
 Senate Committee on Military AffairsWelton, chair
 Senate Committee on Privileges and ElectionsRoehr, chair
 Senate Committee on Public HealthMailer, chair
 Senate Committee on Public LandsFisher, chair
 Senate Committee on RailroadsWithee, chair
 Senate Committee on Roads and BridgesPeirce, chair
 Senate Committee on State AffairsPutnam, chair
 Senate Committee on Town and County OrganizationsYoumans, chair

Assembly committees
 Assembly Committee on AgricultureBarney A. Eaton, chair
 Assembly Committee on Assessment and Collection of TaxesN. B. Treat, chair
 Assembly Committee on Bills on their Third ReadingBernard C. Wolter, chair
 Assembly Committee on CitiesFrank Anson, chair
 Assembly Committee on CorporationsCharles A. Stanley, chair
 Assembly Committee on Dairy and FoodWilliam Froehlich, chair
 Assembly Committee on EducationFrank T. Tucker, chair
 Assembly Committee on Engrossed BillsGeorge W. Latta, chair
 Assembly Committee on Enrolled BillsMark H. Barnum, chair
 Assembly Committee on Finance, Banks, and InsuranceWilliam A. Jones, chair
 Assembly Committee on Federal RelationsOmar L. Rosenkrans, chair
 Assembly Committee on the JudiciarySilas Bullard, chair
 Assembly Committee on Legislative ExpendituresA. L. Utt, chair
 Assembly Committee on Lumber and MiningA. R. Hall, chair
 Assembly Committee on ManufacturesJoseph C. Marsh, chair
 Assembly Committee on Military AffairsGeorge W. Taylor, chair
 Assembly Committee on Public LandsAndrew Jensen, chair
 Assembly Committee on Public Health and SanitationJesse A. Clason, chair
 Assembly Committee on Public ImprovementsWilliam F. Sieker, chair
 Assembly Committee on Privileges and ElectionsHerman C. Wipperman, chair
 Assembly Committee on RailroadsEmerson D. Hoyt, chair
 Assembly Committee on Roads and BridgesJames O. Davidson, chair
 Assembly Committee on State AffairsJesse Stone, chair
 Assembly Committee on Town and County OrganizationJonathan J. Smith, chair
 Assembly Committee on Ways and MeansWilliam G. Wheeler, chair

Joint committees
 Joint Committee on Charitable and Penal InstitutionsStebbins (Sen.) & William T. Lewis (Asm.), co-chairs
 Joint Committee on ClaimsBaxter (Sen.) & George H. Ray (Asm.), co-chairs
 Joint Committee on Fish and GameTimme (Sen.) & Lester B. Dresser (Asm.), co-chairs
 Joint Committee on PrintingMunson (Sen.) & William M. Fogo (Asm.), co-chairs

Changes from the 42nd Legislature
New districts for the 43rd Legislature were defined in 1896 Wisconsin Special Session Act 1, passed into law in the 42nd Wisconsin Legislature.

Senate redistricting

Summary of changes
 7 districts were left unchanged (1, 2, 3, 13, 15, 19, 32).
 Dane County became a single district again (26) after previously having been divided between two districts.
 Milwaukee County went from having 4 and a half districts to 5 districts (4, 5, 6, 7, 8).
 Fond du Lac County lost its single-district status and was combined with Green Lake County (18).
 Two counties were split in multi-county districts (Rock & Jefferson), down from seven under the previous map.

 Fond du Lac County became its own district (18) after previously having been split between two districts.
 Only three single-county districts remain (18, 19, 20).
 Seven counties are split between multi-county senate districts.

Senate districts

Assembly redistricting

Summary of changes
 35 districts were left unchanged.
 Dane County went from having 4 districts to 3.
 Dodge County went from having 3 districts to 2.
 Douglas County went from having 1 district to 2.
 Fond du Lac County went from having 3 districts to 2.
 Milwaukee County went from having 14 districts to 15.
 Portage County went from having 1 district to 2.
 No district comprised more than three counties.

Assembly districts

Notes

References

External links
 1897: Related Documents from Wisconsin Legislature

1897 in Wisconsin
1898 in Wisconsin
Wisconsin
Wisconsin legislative sessions